Royal Caribbean Group, formerly known as Royal Caribbean Cruises Ltd., is a global cruise holding company incorporated in Liberia and based in Miami, Florida. It is the world's second-largest cruise line operator, after Carnival Corporation & plc. As of January 2021, Royal Caribbean Group fully owns three cruise lines: Royal Caribbean International, Celebrity Cruises, and Silversea Cruises. They also hold a 50% stake in TUI Cruises and the now-defunct Pullmantur Cruises and CDF Croisières de France. Previously Royal Caribbean Group also fully owned Azamara Cruises selling the cruise line to Sycamore Partners in January 2021, and 50% of Island Cruises, selling their stake to TUI Travel PLC in October 2008.

History

Royal Caribbean Group was formed as Royal Caribbean Cruises Ltd. in 1997 when Royal Caribbean Cruise Line purchased Celebrity Cruises. The decision was made to keep the two cruise line brands separate following the merger; as a result Royal Caribbean Cruise Line was re-branded Royal Caribbean International and Royal Caribbean Cruises Ltd. was established as the new parent company of both Royal Caribbean International and Celebrity Cruises.

A third brand under Royal Caribbean Cruises ownership was formed in 2000 when Island Cruises was created as a joint venture with First Choice Holidays. Island Cruises became an informal cruise line on the British and Brazilian markets.

In November 2006, Royal Caribbean Cruises purchased Pullmantur Cruises based in Madrid, Spain. From there, the company expanded rapidly with the creation of Azamara Cruises in May 2007 as a subsidiary of Celebrity Cruises. It followed this with the formation of CDF Croisières de France in May 2008 to serve the French-language market.

Royal Caribbean also has an interest in TUI Cruises, a joint venture with TUI AG, which began operations in 2009 aimed at a German-speaking market. TUI Cruises's subsidiary, TUI Travel, had a 50% interest in Island Cruises following their merger with First Choice Holidays in 2007. In October 2008, Royal Caribbean Cruises rationalized their holdings by selling their share of Island Cruises to TUI.

In early 2019, Royal Caribbean announced in a joint venture with ITM Group the formation of Holistica, a company that intends to develop cruise destinations. The only known destination that the company is to develop is the Grand Lucayan Resort, located in Freeport after the hotel campus was sold to newly formed subsidiary by the Bahamian Government.

On July 10, 2020, Royal Caribbean Cruises purchased the remaining shares of Silversea Cruises. That same month, it also changed its name to Royal Caribbean Group. It also adjusted its logo. Royal Caribbean sold Azamara  Cruises to Sycamore Partners in March 2021 for $201 million.

In July 2022, Royal Caribbean Group received court approval to purchase Endeavor, a former Crystal Cruise ship, for $275 million. The ship will be renamed Silver Endeavour when it officially joins the Royal Caribbean's subsidiary, Silversea Cruises' fleet.

Subsidiaries

Royal Caribbean International

Celebrity Cruises

Silversea Cruises 

Silversea Cruises is a luxury cruise line headquartered in Monaco.  Founded in 1994 by the Vlasov Group of Monaco and the Lefebvre family of Rome it pioneered all-inclusive cruising with its first ship, Silver Cloud. Since July 2020, it has been owned by Royal Caribbean Group.

Other significant investments

Pullmantur Cruises

TUI Cruises

Holistica 
Holistica was formed in early 2019 after the purchase of the Grand Lucayan Resort in a joint venture by Royal Caribbean and ITM Group. Since the purchase, Royal Caribbean has announced that it is intended for the resort to be developed into a cruise destination that will benefit the local Freeport economy. It was also announced by the CEO of Royal Caribbean that Freeport Harbor will be developed into a cruise facility of choice.

Former brands 
Island Cruises (50% share, owned 2000–2008)
CDF Croisières de France (2007-2017)
SkySea Cruise Lines (35%, 2016–2018)
Azamara Cruises

Other companies owned by Royal Caribbean Group
Wamos Air (formerly Air Pullmantur, 19% share)

References

External links

 

 
Companies listed on the New York Stock Exchange
Cruise lines
Companies based in Miami
Transport companies established in 1997
Offshore companies of Liberia